The Central Mississippi Correctional Facility for Women (CMCF) is a Mississippi Department of Corrections (MDOC) prison for men and women located in an unincorporated area in Rankin County, Mississippi, near the city of Pearl. The  prison is the only state prison to hold female prisoners in Mississippi, in addition to minimum and medium security male offenders. As such, it operates as the female death row of the state.

The prison is in proximity to the cities of Brandon and Jackson.

The prison houses the Receiving and Classification Unit (R&C), where most prisoners entering the MDOC system are held before going to their permanent unit assignments. Most male inmates who are sentenced to MDOC by the courts or who are returned to MDOC as parole violators, probation violators, intensive supervision program (ISP) violators, earned release supervision (ERS) violators, and suspension violators are placed at R&C. All women inmates who are sentenced to MDOC by the courts or who are returned to MDOC as parole violators, probation violators, ISP violators, ERS violators, and suspension violators are placed in 1A or 2B at CMCF. Male death row inmates do not go to CMCF; they are transferred from county jails and immediately go to the Mississippi State Penitentiary, the location of the male death row.

MDOC states that CMCF was "designed to provide aesthetics along with security."

History
CMCF opened in January 1986 with a capacity of 667 prisoners. CMCF was the first prison facility of the Mississippi Department of Corrections outside of the Mississippi State Penitentiary (MSP) in Sunflower County. Upon the opening of CMCF, female prisoners were transferred from MSP to CMCF; previously women were held in MSP Camp 25. CMCF was designed by Dale and Associates. It was originally named the Rankin County Correctional Facility (RCCF).  Johnson & Johnson uses prison labor from this facility to operate a "clean room" for the cleaning and sterilizing of suture spools.

Demographics
As of September 1, 2008, Central Mississippi Correctional Facility, with a capacity of 3,665, had 3,610 prisoners, making up a total of 25.07% of people within the Mississippi Department of Corrections-operated prisons, county jails, and community work centers. Of the male inmates at CMCF, 1,383 are Black, 738 are White, 16 are Hispanic, three are Native American, two are Asian, and one has no available data. Of the female prisoners, 781 are Black, 672 are White, 8 are Hispanic, 3 are Asian, 2 are Native American, and one has no available data.

Notable inmates
Inmates incarcerated at CMCF:
 Carla Hughes - Former middle schoolteacher convicted of two counts of capital murder for the murders of her lover's pregnant fiancee Avis Banks and her unborn child.
 Luke Woodham - Pearl High School shooter, since moved to the Mississippi State Penitentiary.

Death Row
 Lisa Jo Chamberlin - Chamberlin, along with Roger Lee Gillett, were convicted in the March 2004 deaths of Linda Heintzelman and Heintzelman's boyfriend, Vernon Hulett. Their bodies were found inside a freezer at an abandoned farm.

See also

 Capital punishment in Mississippi

References

External links
 "State Prisons." Mississippi Department of Corrections.

Prisons in Mississippi
Women's prisons in the United States
Capital punishment in Mississippi
Buildings and structures in Rankin County, Mississippi
1986 establishments in Mississippi
Women in Mississippi